Swedish Board for Accreditation and Conformity Assessment is the national accreditation body, assessing the competence of laboratories, certification and inspection bodies in Sweden.

It is one of the Government agencies in Sweden that answers to the Swedish Ministry for Foreign Affairs. The agency is located in Borås.   It is also responsible for regulations and surveillance in the field of legal metrology.

External links
 

Government agencies of Sweden
Science and technology in Sweden